Traumatic alopecia is a cutaneous condition that results from the forceful pulling out of the scalp hair.

See also 
 Traction alopecia
 List of cutaneous conditions

References 

Conditions of the skin appendages